A Fonsagrada is a comarca in the Galician Province of Lugo. The overall population of this local region is 4,921 (2019).

Municipalities
Baleira, A Fonsagrada and Negueira de Muñiz.

References

Comarcas of the Province of Lugo